Ramón Antonio Fumadó Rodríguez (born December 28, 1981 in Caracas, Distrito Capital) is a male diver from Venezuela, who competed in three consecutive Summer Olympics for his native country, starting in 2000. He claimed two gold medals at the 2008 South American Swimming Championships in São Paulo.

References
 sports-reference

1981 births
Living people
Venezuelan male divers
Divers at the 2000 Summer Olympics
Divers at the 2004 Summer Olympics
Divers at the 2007 Pan American Games
Divers at the 2008 Summer Olympics
Olympic divers of Venezuela
Sportspeople from Caracas
Divers at the 2003 Pan American Games
Pan American Games competitors for Venezuela
21st-century Venezuelan people